Emmanuel Nunes (31 August 1941 – 2 September 2012) was a Portuguese composer who lived and worked in Paris from 1964.

Biography
Nunes was born in Lisbon, where he studied composition, first from 1959 to 1963 at the Academia de Amadores de Música with Francine Benoit, and then with Fernando Lopes-Graça at the university (1962–64). He then attended courses at the Darmstädter Ferienkurse (1963–65), and in 1964 moved to Paris. A year later he moved to Cologne and enrolled at the Hochschule für Musik Köln, and studied composition with Henri Pousseur, electronic music with Jaap Spek, and phonetics with Georg Heike, while also taking courses with Karlheinz Stockhausen at the third and fourth Cologne Courses  for New Music in 1965–66 and 1966–67.

In 1971 he was awarded the Premier Prix d´Esthetique Musicale in the class of Marcel Beaufils at the Conservatoire National Supérieur de Musique in Paris, in 1999 won the UNESCO Composition Prize, and in 2000 was the winner of the Pessoa Prize.

From the 1980s he took on teaching roles, amongst other places at the Gulbenkian Foundation in Lisbon, Harvard University in the US, at the Conservatoire de Paris, and at the Darmstadt Summer Courses. From 1986 to 1992 he held a professorship in composition at the New Music Institute of the Hochschule für Musik Freiburg. Nunes was named an Officer of the French Order of Arts and Letters in 1986, and in 1991 was appointed Comendador da Ordem de Santiago da Espada by the President of Portugal. From 1992 until 2006 Nunes was Professor of Composition at the Paris Conservatory.

Nunes died in Paris, two days after his seventy-first birthday.

Selected compositions
Opera
 Das Märchen, Opera in a prologue and 2 acts (2007); libretto after Johann Wolfgang von Goethe

Orchestral music
 Fermata for orchestra and tape (1973)
 Ruf for orchestra and tape (1977)
 Chessed I for 4 instrumental ensembles (1979)
 Chessed II for 16 instrumental soloists and orchestra (1979)
 Sequencias for clarinet, 2 vibraphones, violin and orchestra (1982/1983–1988)
 Quodlibet for 28 instruments, 6 percussionists and orchestra, led by 2 conductors (1990–1991)
 Chessed IV for string quartet and orchestra (1992)

Chamber music
 Impromptu pour un voyage I for trumpet, flute, viola and harp (1973)
 Impromptu pour un voyage II for flute, viola and harp (1974–1975)
 Wandlungen for ensemble and live electronics (1986)
 Clivages I and II for 6 percussionists (1987–1988)
 Versus III for alto flute and viola (1987–1990)
 Lichtung I for clarinet, horn, trombone, tuba, 4 percussionists and cello (1988–1991)
 Chessed III for string quartet (1990–1991)
 La Main noire for 3 violas (2006–2007); after the opera Das Märchen

Solo instrumental
 Litanies du feu et de la mer I for piano (1969)
 Litanies du feu et de la mer II for piano (1971)
 Einspielung I for solo violin (1979)
 Einspielung II for solo violoncello (1980)
 Einspielung III for solo viola (1981)
 Ludi concertati No. 1 for solo bass flute (1985)
 Aura for solo flute (1983–1989)
 Improvisation II: Portrait for viola solo (2002)

Vocal music
 Machina Mundi for 4 instrumental soloists, choir, orchestra and tape (1991–1992)

Bibliography
 
 
 
 
 
 
 
 

Footnotes

External links
Publisher's website: Emmanuel Nunes at Ricordi Berlin

Chronological table, biography by Philippe Albèra, and note on Quodlibet by Joseph Häusler
 

 Online biographies of Emmanuel Nunes

1941 births
2012 deaths
Harvard University staff
Portuguese classical composers
Portuguese musicians
20th-century classical composers
Portuguese opera composers
People from Lisbon
Pessoa Prize winners
Academic staff of the Hochschule für Musik Freiburg
Pupils of Karlheinz Stockhausen
Portuguese male classical composers
Conservatoire de Paris alumni
Academic staff of the Conservatoire de Paris
Officiers of the Ordre des Arts et des Lettres
Commanders of the Order of Saint James of the Sword
20th-century male musicians